Khabib Khasibovich Ilyaletdinov (born 1 January 1965) is a former Russian professional footballer of Tatar heritage.

Club career
He made his professional debut in the Soviet First League in 1984 for FC SKA Khabarovsk.

Honours
 Soviet Cup finalist: 1990 (played in the early stages of the 1989–90 tournament for FC Lokomotiv Moscow).

References

1965 births
Footballers from Moscow
Living people
Soviet footballers
Russian footballers
Russian Premier League players
FC Lokomotiv Moscow players
FC Rotor Volgograd players
FC SKA-Khabarovsk players
Soviet First League players
Association football midfielders
FC Spartak Moscow players
FC Torpedo Moscow players
FC FShM Torpedo Moscow players